Amadas Coach is a custom designer and builder of luxury motorhome conversions, luxury motor coaches and "mobile marketing solutions". It was established in 1981 and operates two full-service facilities located in Suffolk, Virginia and Moneta, Virginia. It became page of the Amadas group in 1997. It purchased Featherlite Coaches in 2008.

References

External links
Amadas Coach website

Design companies of the United States